William Linacre (10 August 1924 – 8 January 2010) was an English professional footballer who played as a winger in the Football League for Chesterfield, Manchester City, Middlesbrough, Hartlepools United and Mansfield Town.

References

1924 births
2010 deaths
Footballers from Chesterfield
English footballers
Association football wingers
Chesterfield F.C. players
Manchester City F.C. players
Middlesbrough F.C. players
Goole Town F.C. players
Hartlepool United F.C. players
Mansfield Town F.C. players
Blyth Spartans A.F.C. players
English Football League players